The 1993–94 WRU Challenge Cup, known for sponsorship reasons as the SWALEC Cup, was the 24th WRU Challenge Cup, the annual national rugby union cup competition of Wales. The competition was won by Cardiff who beat Llanelli 15-8 in the final.

Round 5

Round 6

Quarter-finals

Semi-finals

Final

External links
Official Rugby Union Club Directory 1994-95 

WRU Challenge Cup
Challenge Cup
Wales Cup1